Ben Weekes (born 20 September 1984) is an Australian wheelchair tennis player. He represented Australia at the 2020 Tokyo Paralympics, his fifth Games.

Personal
Weekes was born on 20 September 1984 in Strathfield, New South Wales. He has an identical twin brother, and two other brothers. He is an incomplete paraplegic as a result of a blood clot forming in his spine when he was thirteen years old. He is a composer and pianist, having received formal training in this area. His music has been recorded and he has played at the BarMe Cabaret Bar, Angel Place and the Sydney Opera House.

Other sports he participates in are swimming and basketball.

Tennis
Weekes is a wheelchair tennis player. When playing, he follows the same rules as his non-disabled counterparts except the ball is allowed to bounce twice. He became interested in the sport after watching David Hall play it at the 2000 Summer Paralympics, and would go on to practice regularly with Hall, until Hall retired from the sport in 2006. He has been coached by Kathy Fahim.

Weekes first represented Australia in 2002. That year, he competed in the Junior World Cup where he finished second. At the 2004 World Cup, his team finished second. He competed at the 2004 Summer Paralympics in Athens. He won his first-round match, and was knocked out in the second round.

Weekes competed at the 2008 Summer Paralympics, playing doubles with Michael Dobbie. Going into the 2008 Games, he practised twice a day on court, six times a week. In 2008, Weekes played some doubles matches with Adam Kellerman.

At the 2011 South African Open, he made the finals. At the 2012 Summer Paralympics, he made the second round of the men's singles and he teamed with Adam Kellerman in the men's doubles. They lost in the first round. In the doubles event, he is due to be partnered by Adam Kellerman.

At the 2016 Rio Paralympics, Weekes lost to Stefan Olsson (SWE) 0-2 (0-6, 3–6) in the round of 32 in the Men's Singles and with Adam Kellerman lost in the round of 16 in the Men's Doubles.

At the 2020 Tokyo Paralympics, Weekes lost in the Round of 32 in the Men's Singles and Doubles.

References

External links

 
 
 
 

1984 births
Living people
Australian male tennis players
Australian wheelchair tennis players
Paralympic wheelchair tennis players of Australia
Wheelchair tennis players at the 2004 Summer Paralympics
Wheelchair tennis players at the 2008 Summer Paralympics
Wheelchair tennis players at the 2012 Summer Paralympics
Wheelchair tennis players at the 2016 Summer Paralympics
Wheelchair tennis players at the 2020 Summer Paralympics
People with paraplegia
Tennis people from New South Wales
21st-century Australian people